"Strangers" is a song performed by Norwegian singer and songwriter Sigrid. The song was released as a digital download on 10 November 2017 by Island Records. The song peaked at number six on the Norwegian Singles Chart. Outside Norway, the single topped the charts in Scotland and Croatia and peaked within the top ten of the charts in the Republic of Ireland and the United Kingdom. The song is included on the singer's debut album, Sucker Punch, serving as the second single from the project.

Music video
An official music video for "Strangers" was directed by Ivana Bobic for Riff Raff Films. It was first released onto YouTube on 30 November 2017, with a length of four minutes and four seconds. As of 10 April 2021, it has gained over 61 million views.

Track listing

Charts

Weekly charts

Year-end charts

Certifications

Release history

References

2017 songs
2017 singles
Island Records singles
Number-one singles in Scotland
Sigrid (singer) songs
Songs written by Martin Sjølie
Songs written by Sigrid (singer)